Plateau Point is a 3,789 ft cliff-elevation point in the Grand Canyon, Coconino County of northern Arizona, United States. It is about 3.0 miles north-northeast of Grand Canyon Village, and about 2.0 miles north of Grandeur and Yavapai Points, and below the South Rim. Plateau Point, (about 1600 ft above the Colorado River), overlooks the outfall intersection of Garden Creek Canyon, and Pipe Creek Canyon, intersecting from the southeast from Mather and Yaki Points. The point is on the Tonto Platform, and is accessed by the short Plateau Point Trail, from the Tonto Trail, which crosses the west of the Plateau Point platform.

Plateau Point sits on the cliff-former (and platform-former) Tapeats Sandstone, which borders the northwest of Garden Creek Canyon (lower canyon), as well as the northeast. The Tapeats Sandstone sits on rocks of the Great Unconformity, the 1,000 my layer of missing rock and time.

Geology: Tapeats Sandstone, the Tonto Platform

Plateau Point, a point on a platform of a cliff-formed rock unit, is common of the platforms created in the Grand Canyon. One notable, and highly visible example, are the points created by the upper platforms of the Redwall Limestone. Across the Colorado River and just downstream from Plateau Point, is the Tower of Set, with its beautiful points of Redwall Limestone cliffs and upper platforms.

Plateau Point sits on cliffs of Tapeats Sandstone, approximately 100 ft to 200 ft thick. The Tonto Trail traverses the platform of the Tapeats both to Tonto Trail (east), and to the extreme west, just beyond the Grand Scenic Divide, to Tonto Trail (west).

Overlooking the Garden Creek & Pipe Creek Canyon outfall

Plateau Point overlooks the Lower Canyon's of the intersection of Garden Creek Canyon and intersecting Pipe Creek Canyon from the southeast. The Tonto Trail is forced to traverse south of this steep canyon region, and continue its traverse eastward towards the East Grand Canyon, as far as the Grand Canyon, East Rim, about 20 mi+ distance, by trail.

See also
 Geology of the Grand Canyon area
 Plateau Point Trail
 The Battleship (Grand Canyon)

References

External links
 Aerial view, Plateau Point, Mountainzone
 Aerial view, Yavapai Point, Mountainzone
 Plateau Point Hike Guide

Grand Canyon
Grand Canyon National Park
Grand Canyon, South Rim
Scenic viewpoints in Grand Canyon National Park